Claudia Kohde-Kilsch and Helena Suková were the defending champions but did not compete that year.

Katrina Adams and Zina Garrison won in the final 7–5, 7–5 against Gigi Fernández and Robin White.

Seeds
Champion seeds are indicated in bold text while text in italics indicates the round in which those seeds were eliminated.

 Gigi Fernández /  Robin White (final)
 Lori McNeil /  Betsy Nagelsen (quarterfinals)
 Eva Pfaff /  Elizabeth Smylie (semifinals)
 Patty Fendick /  Jill Hetherington (semifinals)

Draw

References
 1988 World Doubles Championships Draw

WTA Doubles Championships
1988 WTA Tour